Tolar may refer to:

Coins and currencies
Tolar
Slovenian tolar

Place
Tolar Grande
Tolar, Texas

People

Charlie Tolar
Daniel Tolar

Fictional people
Avery Tolar
Grathon Tolar

See also

Tola (disambiguation)